Ansan Greeners FC is a South Korean professional football club based in Ansan that competes in the K League 2, the second tier of South Korean football. Founded in 2017, they play their home matches at Ansan Wa~ Stadium.

History
On 22 July 2016, the Ansan Government officially announced the establishment of a professional football club based in Ansan. In October of the same year, Lee Heung-sil was appointed as the club's first manager.

In September 2018, Lim Wan-sup was appointed as the club's second manager. He left the club in December 2019 as a result of mutual termination, and was replaced by Kim Gil-sik.

Players

Current squad

Out on loan

Managerial history

Season-by-season records

References

External links
Official website 

 
K League 2 clubs
Association football clubs established in 2017
2017 establishments in South Korea